Joseph Wick Miller (July 24, 1850 – August 28, 1891) was a German-American second baseman and manager in Major League Baseball. He was born in Germany.

They were 0–11 and didn't finish the season. He batted .139 in 29 games.

He died at the age of 41 in White Bear Lake, Minnesota.

External links

1850 births
1891 deaths
Major League Baseball second basemen
Major League Baseball players from Germany
German emigrants to the United States
19th-century baseball players
Baseball player-managers
Washington Nationals (NA) players
Keokuk Westerns players
Chicago White Stockings players
St. Paul Red Caps players